John Joseph Cerutti (April 28, 1960 – October 3, 2004) was an American left-handed pitcher in Major League Baseball for the Toronto Blue Jays and Detroit Tigers between 1985 and 1991, and was later a broadcaster for the Blue Jays.

Playing career
Born in Albany, New York, Cerutti attended Amherst College, and graduated with a bachelor's degree in economics. In 1980, he played collegiate summer baseball with the Harwich Mariners of the Cape Cod Baseball League and was named a league all-star.

Cerutti played seven seasons in the major leagues with the Blue Jays (–) and Detroit Tigers.

On June 7, 1989, Cerutti recorded the first Blue Jays win in SkyDome, their new stadium.

On December 20, 1990, the Toronto Blue Jays granted him free agency. He signed as a free agent with the Detroit Tigers on 
January 14, 1991.

Broadcasting career
After his playing career, he went into broadcasting and started calling Blue Jays games alongside Brian Williams on CBC before becoming a TV analyst for the team's new flagship station, Rogers Sportsnet.

Death
Cerutti was supposed to broadcast the last game of the 2004 season for the Blue Jays, an afternoon home game on October 3 versus the New York Yankees, but he uncharacteristically missed an 11:00 AM pregame meeting. The production staff began to worry and started calling him. After numerous attempts, the police had to be brought in to break open the door of his Toronto hotel room. He was found without any vital signs. His death at age 44 was officially declared to be of natural causes due to a ventricular arrhythmia.

"It was an unbelievable shock," Blue Jays president Paul Godfrey said, in various wire reports. "We all realize, those of us involved in winning and losing games, how unimportant that is at a time like this."

The Toronto chapter of the Baseball Writers' Association of America paid tribute to John Cerutti in November, 2004, giving him its annual Good Guy Award and renaming the honor for him. The award has been handed out every year since Toronto's inaugural season in 1977, and is given annually to an individual who best exemplifies a positive image for baseball. John Cerutti was known for his exemplary character, goodwill, and sportsmanship.

References

External links

Historic Baseball

1960 births
2004 deaths
Albany Diamond Dogs players
American expatriate baseball players in Canada
Amherst Mammoths baseball players
Baseball players from New York (state)
Canadian television sportscasters
Detroit Tigers players
Major League Baseball broadcasters
Major League Baseball pitchers
Sportspeople from Albany, New York
Syracuse Chiefs players
Toronto Blue Jays announcers
Toronto Blue Jays players
Harwich Mariners players